Montana is the 41st state to enter the United States, and has a culturally-diverse population representing a broad spectrum of music genre, style, and instrumentation.c

Due to its migration patterns and place in the American West, Montana has a heritage of pioneer folk music and cowboy songs and poetry.  The state also has a tradition of baroque, classical, and romantic era music:  two prominent musical institutions, both classical, are the Great Falls Symphony Orchestra, which was established in 1958, and the Bozeman Symphony Orchestra, which was established in 1963. The Helena Symphony was founded in 1955 and is known to be one of the premier symphonies of Montana and the Northwest. The Billings Symphony and Chorus is the premier symphony in Montana, performing for the community throughout the year. Visit their websites

Montana has two official state songs: "Montana" and "Montana Melody."

Native American music

Montana is home to several Indian reservations and traditionally to more than two dozen distinct tribes, each with their own forms of music.  These include the Blackfeet, Crow, Flathead, Cheyenne, Chippewa-Cree, Gros Ventre, Assiniboine, and Sioux. An example of the modern synthesis of popular and traditional Native music in Montana is Jack Gladstone, a folk musician and lecturer/presenter who embraces Native themes, and who has collaborated with fellow Montana musician Rob Quist.

Popular Music & Musicians
Montana country musicians include Rob Quist, formerly of the Mission Mountain Wood Band. The Bridger Creek Boys , of Bozeman, are a Bluegrass band that were finalists at the Telluride Bluegrass Festival's 2007 Best New Band Contest.

Other popular musicians from Montana include Seattle's Pearl Jam bassist Jeff Ament (who attended the University of Montana), and guitarist/producer Steve Albini. Grunge pioneer Bruce Fairweather is also from Montana.

Another well known band includes Helena and Missoula's The Skoidats, who recorded on New York City's Moon Ska label in the late 1990s. 

Lead singer Colin Meloy and members of the Portland band The Decemberists are from Montana, and were in a band named after the small town of Tarkio, in Mineral County.  Meloy graduated from the University of Montana in 1998. Seattle's Modest Mouse lead singer Isaac Brock was born in Helena.  

Country singer Doug Adkins was born in Havre. Country singer Randy Rhoads was born in Wolf Point, Montana and lived in Malta throughout most of his career as a recording artist for Blue Ridge Records. He appeared on TNN's Nashville Now with Ralph Emery twice.

John Mayer visited and fell in love with Bozeman, where he bought a house and re-settled in the spring of 2012. His album Paradise Valley is named for where he lives in Montana and features country music influences.

One of Montana's favorite modern era rock bands is Dawghouse from Helena.
Jared Blake, Nashville singer/songwriter, finalist from season 1 of The Voice, sings about the beautiful Montana Skies in his song "Oak Tree" and the video was filmed in Montana. It features the Montana based Bikers Against Bullies USA non-profit organization and their national anti-bullying campaign.

The largest, indoor concert venue in Montana is the MetraPark Arena, which opened in 1975 in Billings.

Songs about Montana:

 Wild Montana Skies by John Denver
 Montana Lullaby by Ken Overcast
 Me and My Gang by Rascal Flatts
 Montana by Frank Zappa
 Livingston Saturday Night by Jimmy Buffet
 Montana on My Mind by Shane Close
 Cut Bank Montana by Hank Williams Jr
 Meet Me in Montana by Dan Seals
 Big City by Merle Haggard
 Home is Where Montana Is by Bruce Anfison
 Montana by Charles C. Cohan
 I’ll Wait for You by Joe Nichols
 Goodnight, Montana by Dave Walburn
 Montana Rodeo by Chris LeDoux
 Midnight in Missoula by Nanci Griffith
 Montana by Sons of the Pioneers
 Showdown At Big Sky by Robbie Robertson
 Montana by John Linnell
 Big Sky Country by Acoustic Alchemy
 Blue Mountain Skies by Riders In The Sky
 Montana Sky by White Heart
 Hey Montana by Eve 6
 Girl From Montana by The Henderson Sisters

Electronic
Electronic music composer Ruth Anderson was born in Kalispell.

Independent music scene
In the Flathead Valley, some of the more popular acts are Marshall Catch (country tinged-rock), Luke Dowler (rock/singer-songwriter), God Fearing Women, and The Rockaholics.

Music education
Post-secondary educational institutions which offer a program or major in music include the University of Montana, Montana State University, Montana State University Billings, and Rocky Mountain College.

References

 
Montana culture
Montana